The 14th annual Venice International Film Festival was held from 20 August to 4 September 1953. The Golden Lion of Saint Mark was not awarded this year. The jury, having examined the films in competition and noting the considerable average high level of the motion pictures presented, found that no work prevailed in terms of absolute value. In accordance with article 20 of the 1953 regulation, the jury requested from the president of the festival the authorization not to award the Grand Prix, which was finally granted. Instead, the jury decided to award the Silver Lion to six films.

Jury 
 Eugenio Montale (head of jury)
 Gaetano Carancini
 Sandro De Feo
 Nino Ghelli 
 Gian Gaspare Napolitano
 
 Antonio Petrucci

In Competition

Awards
Silver Lion
Thérèse Raquin (Marcel Carné)
Ugetsu (Kenji Mizoguchi)
Moulin Rouge (John Huston)
I Vitelloni (Federico Fellini)
Sadko (Aleksandr Ptushko)
Little Fugitive (Ray Ashley, Morris Engel and Ruth Orkin) 
Volpi Cup
Best Actor - Henri Vilbert (Le bon Dieu sans confession) 
Best Actress - Lilli Palmer (The Fourposter)
Bronze Lion
Pickup on South Street (Samuel Fuller)
I Was a Parish Priest (Rafael Gil)
Les Orgueilleux (Yves Allégret)
The Landowner's Daughter (Tom Payne)
OCIC Award
I Was a Parish Priest (Rafael Gil) 
Pasinetti Award
Ugetsu (Kenji Mizoguchi)

References

External links
 
 Venice Film Festival 1953 Awards on IMDb

1953 film festivals
1953 in Italy
Venice Film Festival
Film
August 1953 events in Europe
September 1953 events in Europe